The Kowloon City District Council is the district council for the Kowloon City District in Hong Kong. It is one of 18 such councils. The Kowloon City District Council currently consists of 25 members, of which the district is divided into 25 constituencies, electing a total of 25 members. The last election was held on 24 November 2019.

History
The Kowloon City District Council was established on 16 December 1981 under the name of the Kowloon City District Board as the result of the colonial Governor Murray MacLehose's District Administration Scheme reform. The District Board was partly elected with the ex-officio Urban Council members, as well as members appointed by the Governor until 1994 when last Governor Chris Patten refrained from appointing any member.

The Kowloon City District Board became Kowloon City Provisional District Board after the Hong Kong Special Administrative Region (HKSAR) was established in 1997 with the appointment system being reintroduced by Chief Executive Tung Chee-hwa. The current Kowloon City District Council was established on 1 January 2000 after the first District Council election in 1999. The council has become fully elected when the appointed seats were abolished in 2011 after the modified constitutional reform proposal was passed by the Legislative Council in 2010.

The Kowloon City District Council has been under control of the conservative and pro-Beijing camp and was the stronghold of the conservative Liberal Democratic Federation of Hong Kong (LDF) and its successor Hong Kong Progressive Alliance (HKPA) in the 1990s and the early 2000s until the party strength was heavily crippled in the 2003 election and was subsequently merged into the pro-Beijing Democratic Alliance for the Betterment and Progress of Hong Kong (DAB) in 2005. The LDF's main rival was the district-based Kowloon City Observers led by Ringo Chiang Sai-cheong in the 1990s until Chiang switched to the Liberal Party in the late 1990s. The pro-Taipei 123 Democratic Alliance also had their presence in the district, represented by its chairman Yum Sin-ling in Prince in the late 1990s.

Riding on the anti-government sentiments following the historic July 1 protest, the Democratic Party took over the Progressive Alliance as the largest party in the 2003 pro-democracy tide by winning seven seats in total. Together with the Association for Democracy and People's Livelihood (ADPL), the pro-democrats won the plurality of elected seats only being balanced by the government-appointed seats. By the end of the term, the number of seats commanded by the Democrats reduced to three and lost their largest party status to the DAB. The DAB since has become the largest party in the district, taking control of the council with the recently emerged Kowloon West New Dynamic, a district-based group uniting the pro-Beijing independents under Legislative Councillor Priscilla Leung, who was also the District Councillor for Whampoa East.

In the 2015 election, the new localist group Youngspiration which evolved from the 2014 Hong Kong protests contested in the Kowloon City District, with Yau Wai-ching unsuccessfully challenged Priscilla Leung with a narrow margin and Kwong Po-yin successfully ousted the incumbent council chairman Lau Wai-wing.

The pro-democrats scored a historic landslide victory in the 2019 election amid the massive pro-democracy protests, taking control of the council by securing 15 of the 25 seats. The Democratic Party emerged as the largest party, overtaking DAB with 10 seats.

Political control
Since 1982 political control of the council has been held by the following parties:

Political makeup

Elections are held every four years.

District result maps

Members represented
Starting from 1 January 2020:

Leadership

Chairs
Since 1985, the chairman is elected by all the members of the board:

Vice Chairs

Notes

References

 
Districts of Hong Kong
Kowloon City District